The Xining Stadium is a sports venue in Xining, the capital of Qinghai Province, China. It has a seating capacity of 40,000 and is used mostly for football matches.

References

Football venues in China
Multi-purpose stadiums in China
Buildings and structures in Xining
Sports venues in Qinghai